Chhayanat may refer to:

 Chhayanat (raga), the Hindustani raga
 Chhayanaut, a cultural organisation of Bangladesh

See also
 Chhayanath Rara, an urban municipality in Nepal